Ameghino may refer to:

 Carlos Ameghino (1865-1936), Argentine paleontologist and explorer, brother of Florentino
 Florentino Ameghino (1853-1911), Argentine naturalist, paleontologist, anthropologist and zoologist, brother of Carlos
 Sabrina Ameghino (born 1980), Argentinian sprint canoeist
 Ameghino (crater), a lunar crater
 Ameghino Gully, a landform in Longing Peninsula, Nordenskjold Coast, Antarctica

See also
 Centro Ameghino, a hospital in Buenos Aires, Argentina